The 1934 Howard Bulldogs football team was an American football team that represented Howard College—now known as Samford University—as a member of the Dixie Conference and the Southern Intercollegiate Athletic Association (SIAA) in the 1934 college football season. Led by Clyde Propst in his first and only season as head coach, the team compiled an overall record of 3–4–2 and with a mark of 0–1 in Dixie Conference play and 2–1–1 against SIAA competition.

Schedule

References

Howard
Howard
Samford Bulldogs football seasons
Howard Bulldogs football